Hunan International Economics University is a private university located in Yuelu District, Changsha, Hunan, China.

As of fall 2013, the university has one campus, a combined student body of 26,158 students and 1,614 faculty members.

The university consists of 11 colleges, with 41 specialties for undergraduates. The university covers a total area of 1,700 mu, with more than 427,600 square meters of floor space.

As of 2021, Hunan International Economics University ranked 2nd in Hunan and 100th nationwide among private universities in China in the recent edition of the recognized Best Chinese Universities Ranking.

History

The university was founded in 1997, it was initially called "Xiangnan College of Letters and Science".

In 1998, it renamed "Hunan International Economics University".

Academics

 School of Business
 School of Management
 School of Humanity and Law
 School of Physical Culture 
 School of Foreign Languages     
 School of Mechanical Engineering 
 School of Information Science and Engineering 
 School of Art and Design
 School of Music
 School of Continuing Education
 Laureate International School

Library collections

Hunan International Economics University's total collection amounts to more than 1.4656 million items.

Culture
 Motto:

People

Notable alumni
 Zhu Zenghui

References

External links

Universities and colleges in Hunan
Business schools in China
Educational institutions established in 1997
Education in Changsha
1997 establishments in China
Universities and colleges in Changsha
Yuelu District